Batocera punctata is a species of beetle in the family Cerambycidae. It was described by Schwarzer in 1925. It is known from Taiwan.

References

Batocerini
Beetles described in 1925